The 1976 United States Senate election in Delaware took place on November 2, 1976. Incumbent Republican U.S. Senator Bill Roth won reelection to a second term.

Candidates
William V. Roth, Jr. (Republican), incumbent U.S. Senator
Thomas Maloney (Democratic), Mayor of Wilmington
Donald G. Gies (American), engineer, perennial candidate and officer in the US Air Force Reserve.
Joseph F. McInerney (Non-Partisan)
John A. Massimilla (Prohibition)

Results

County results

See also 
 1976 United States Senate elections

References

Delaware
1976
1976 Delaware elections